Patagopterygiformes is an extinct group of large terrestrial ornithuromorphs from the Late Cretaceous of South America. It contains at most three genera: Patagopteryx, Alamitornis and possibly Kuszholia.

References 

Prehistoric euornitheans
Late Cretaceous dinosaurs of South America
Cretaceous Argentina
Fossils of Argentina
Taxa named by José Bonaparte